Angel Robinson may refer to:

 Angel Robinson (basketball, born 1989), basketball player for Marquette University
 Angel Robinson (basketball, born 1987), basketball player for the Phoenix Mercury
 Angel Robinson Garcia (1937–2000), Cuban boxer

See also
 Angela Robinson (disambiguation)